Andreas Voss (born 27 February 1979) is a German former professional footballer who played as midfielder. He represented Germany at the 1999 FIFA World Youth Championship.

References

1979 births
Living people
People from Stolberg (Rhineland)
Sportspeople from Cologne (region)
German footballers
Germany B international footballers
Germany under-21 international footballers
Germany youth international footballers
Association football midfielders
Bundesliga players
2. Bundesliga players
Bayer 04 Leverkusen players
Bayer 04 Leverkusen II players
MSV Duisburg players
VfL Wolfsburg players
Footballers from North Rhine-Westphalia